Suja Karthika is an Indian actress and dancer who has appeared in Malayalam films. She Holds a PhD in commerce from Cochin University of Science and Technology. She currently teaches at the Lee Shau Kee School of Business and Administration of Hong Kong Metropolitan University

Karthika's debut film was the 2002, Rajasenan film Malayali Mamanu Vanakkam. Her well known roles include in films such as Paadam Onnu: Oru Vilapam (2003), Runway (2004), Nerariyan CBI (2005), Achanurangatha Veedu (2006), and Nadiya Kollappetta Rathri (2007). She has appeared in some television serials as well. She is a gold medalist in MBA from MG University. After that she entered as a teacher at SCMS, Aluva and currently teaches at Marian Academy of Management Studies, Puthuppaady, Kothamangalam. Her father Sundareshan serves as the director in the same college.

Personal life 

Suja Karthika was born to Sundareshan & Jaya. She got married on 31 January 2010 to a Mumbai based Merchant Navy engineer Rakesh Krishnan. They have a son Ritwik born on 7 February 2013.

Filmography

Television Serials
2001- Swararagam (Asianet)
2005- Nokketha Doorath (Asianet)
2005- Krishna
2006- Neelakkurinji Veendum Pookkunnu (Surya TV)
2007- Telefilm for Amrita TV co-starring Murali Gopi, V.K. Sreeraman, Mahesh etc. as Meera
2020- Sri Ayyappa Punnya Darsanam (Story Telling Movie)

Other Works
 Onachithrangal as Host
 Pranayam Madhuram as Host
 Sensations as Host
 Sweet Dreams as Host
 Marriage Talk as Host
 Smart Show as Participant
 Fast Track as Presenter

References

External links

Living people
21st-century Indian actresses
Indian film actresses
Actresses from Kochi
Actresses in Malayalam cinema
Actresses in Malayalam television
Indian television actresses
Year of birth missing (living people)